Æon Flux is the video game adaptation of the 2005 science fiction film of the same name, with elements of the Æon Flux animated series. The game was released in November 2005 in North America for PlayStation 2 and Xbox.

Plot
The game is set in the year 2415, after a biological disease has wiped out Earth's population except for its one walled, protected city-state, Bregna. The city is ruled by the congress of scientists who discovered the vaccine for the disease. Æon Flux, the protagonist and top operative in the underground "Monican" rebellion, is sent on a mission to kill one of Bregna's most influential government leaders, Trevor Goodchild. Following a series of self-discoveries and revelations, Æon uncovers a world of secrets which makes her doubt her mission and question everything she thought she knew.

The game's storyline attempts to bridge the gap between the TV series and the film and explain various discrepancies, such as the appearance of the jungle outside Bregna and the differences between the movie and TV series versions of Trevor Goodchild. However, much of the game's visuals and tone skew far more dramatically toward that of the film, supplemented by the fact that the look of Æon in the game is based almost entirely on Charlize Theron's film version, and the character is also voiced by her.

History

Unfinished 1996 game
A game based on the original animated series was announced on April 9, 1996 for the PlayStation. The game, which was loosely based on "The Demiurge" episode, was being developed by Cryo Interactive and published by Viacom New Media. The game first made an appearance at E3 that same year, with Æon Flux creator Peter Chung on hand to promote it, and commercial advertising was even included in the 1996 VHS release of the animated series.

Viacom New Media would merge with Virgin Interactive midway through the game's development. The merger would ultimately lead to the cancellation of Viacom's in-development games and subsequently leave Cryo without the rights to use the Æon Flux property. In mid-1997, the Æon Flux video game rights were acquired by GT Interactive. The game's assets were not lost however, but were reworked into the 1997 title Pax Corpus, having been stripped of all copyrighted association with Æon Flux. Pax Corpus does retain many obvious similarities to the original animated series. Specifically, parts of the plot are similar to "The Demiurge", and many design details bear a striking resemblance to examples found in the show, e.g. the female protagonist wears a purple and black outfit not unlike Æon's.

Unfinished 2000 game

Another failed attempt would be made by The Collective, sometime around the year 2000, and was to be published by GT Interactive. It was using a then-current version of the Unreal Engine, and appeared to be a 3D third-person action title similar to The Collective's previous title, Star Trek: Deep Space Nine: The Fallen. Again at some point during development, the game was cancelled and the project vanished.

Completed 2005 game

In order to coincide with the release of the upcoming film, developer Terminal Reality was tasked with creating a game to tie-in with the film. The team was only given ten months to finish the game, a relatively short time for a non-sequel console game (especially in 2005), as it had to be out in time for the movie's theatrical premier. Still, Terminal Reality rose to the task and managed to create a complete Æon Flux game in less than a year, due in part to the fact that the developer created much of the game using an engine they had already built for their previous title, BloodRayne 2, which cut down on development time dramatically. Nine years after the first ill-fated attempt and five years after the second, an Æon Flux game was finally completed and released to the market in November 2005.

Release

To help add to the box office gross of the film and to sell more games, specially marked copies sold in the US came with a pass to see the Æon Flux film and an attached thank you note from Majesco Entertainment. The movie was in theaters nationwide by December 2 and these tickets expired on December 31, 2005.

Reception

The game received "average" reviews on both platforms according to video game review aggregator Metacritic.

References

External links

AeonFlux.Org chronicles the previous attempts, and includes early screenshots of both unreleased games.

2005 video games
Video game
Action-adventure games
Cancelled PlayStation (console) games
Cyberpunk video games
Majesco Entertainment games
PlayStation 2 games
Science fiction video games
Single-player video games
Video games based on films
Video games based on adaptations
Video games developed in the United States
Video games featuring female protagonists
Video games set in the 25th century
Xbox games
Post-apocalyptic video games
Unreal Engine games
Terminal Reality games